Smannell is a village in Hampshire, England, located two miles north-east of Andover. It lies in the parish of Smannell and Enham Alamein. At the 2011 Census the parish name was given as Smannell.

There is a mixture of housing types including brick and flint, thatched cottages, and more modern 20th-century housing.

The village has a Church of England church - Christ Church.

The Oak pub 
The Oak (originally called The British Oak) dates from the mid 19th century, and in 1990 was sold to Wadworth Brewery, refurbished in 2003 and renamed. It is built using brick and flint (similar to the surrounding houses).

References

External links
 Stained Glass Windows at Christ Church, Smannell, Hampshire
 The Oak

Villages in Hampshire